Bai Chongguang (born August 15, 1970) is a retired boxer from PR China, who competed for his native country at the 1992 Summer Olympics in Barcelona, Spain. There he was defeated in the first round of the Men's Light-Heavyweight (– 81 kg) division by South Korea's Ko Yo-Da (4:18). He won a gold medal at the 1990 Asian Games.

References
 sports-reference

1970 births
Living people
People from Harbin
Sportspeople from Harbin
People from Heilongjiang
Sportspeople from Heilongjiang
Boxers at the 1992 Summer Olympics
Light-heavyweight boxers
Olympic boxers of China
Asian Games medalists in boxing
Boxers at the 1990 Asian Games
Chinese male boxers
Asian Games gold medalists for China

Medalists at the 1990 Asian Games
20th-century Chinese people